__NoToC__

The name of the province might possibly be derived from the Gelae.

Classical sources
According to Strabo, the tribes of the southern Caspian included the Gelae, Cadusii, Amardi, Witii, and Anariacae.  If, as seems probable, this description accurately represents their distribution from west to east, then the Gelae would have lived directly east of the river Araxes, along the border of Armenia.  Their territory is supposed to have been relatively unproductive, of little agricultural or mineral value.  Pliny considers the Gelae and the Cadusii to be synonymous, with "Cadusii" being the tribe's name in Greek, and "Gelae" being its eastern equivalent.  If he is correct, then it is likely that the name of modern Gilan is derived from the Gelae.

According to the late-classical author Bardaisan, the Gelae had feminine men and masculine women, like the citizens of Cumae under the tyrant Aristodemus.

Recent scholarship
Modern scholars have developed various hypotheses about the original location, ethnicity, and the language of the Gelae.  Peter von Uslar writes, "traces of the name of Gelae can be found in northern Dagestan".  The connection between the name of Gilan and the Gelae was further discussed by Vasily Bartold and E.A. Grantovsky, who accept Pliny's identification of the Gelae and Cadusii as one people who spoke an ancestral form of the Talysh language, one of the Iranian languages.

References

Bibliography
 Strabo, Geographica.
 Lucius Mestrius Plutarchus (Plutarch), Lives of the Noble Greeks and Romans.
 Claudius Ptolemaeus (Ptolemy), Geographia.
 Dictionary of Greek and Roman Geography, William Smith, ed., Little, Brown and Company, Boston (1854).
 Peter von Uslar, Этнография Кавказа. Языкознание. IV. Лакский язык (Ethnography of the Caucasus, vol. IV: "The Lak Language"), Tbilisi (1890).
 Kamilla Trever, "Albania in the IV–II Centuries BCE", in Essays on the History and Culture of Caucasian Albania: IV Century BC–VII Century AD (1959).
 "Onomastics and Epigraphy of Medieval Eastern Europe and Byzantium" (1993), p. 204.
 Naturkunde: Lateinisch-Deutsch, Buch VI, Kai Brodersen, ed., Zürich (1996), p. 184.
 A.K. Alikberov, "To the Sources and Historical Foundations of the Koranic story about Yl'juj, Ma'juj and Zu-l-Karnain", in Ars Islamica: In Honor of Stanislav Mikhailovich Prozorov, Nauka, Moscow (2016), p. 350.

External links
Cadusii, at Encyclopædia Iranica.

Cadusii
History of Gilan
Iranian nomads
Scythians
Historical Iranian peoples